Amakinite (IMA symbol: Amk) is a semi transparent yellow-green hydroxide mineral belonging to the brucite group that was discovered in 1962. Its chemical formula is written as (Fe2+,Mg)(OH)2. It usually occurs in the form of splotchy, anhedral crystals forming within a group or structure in other minerals or rocks, such as kimberlite (occurring in diamond-rich eruptive pipe). Its composition is as follows:
 
 Magnesium   5.82%  Mg    9.66% MgO
 Manganese   6.58%  Mn    8.50% MnO
 Iron       46.84%  Fe   60.26% FeO
 Hydrogen    2.42%  H    21.58% 
 Oxygen     38.34%  O

Amakinite is slightly magnetic and was named for the Amakin Expedition, which prospected the diamond deposits of Yakutia in the Russian Far East.

References

 www.handbookofmineralogy.org
 webmineral.com
 www.mindat.org

Oxide minerals
Trigonal minerals
Minerals in space group 166